Amorphophallus elegans is a species of plants from the family Araceae. It is found from South Thailand to Peninsular Malaysia.

References

elegans
Plants described in 1922
Flora of Thailand
Flora of Peninsular Malaysia